Fast N' Loud was a reality-styled Discovery Channel TV show featuring Richard Rawlings and his crew from the Dallas, Texas-based Gas Monkey Garage as they search for tired and run-down cars, and restore them for profit. 

The show was successful in its first season. The show also has a spin-off show called Misfit Garage and Fast N' Loud: Demolition Theater in which Richard and other employees, and also the "victims" of the same clip watch these with their comments

Rawlings, along with former GMG mechanic Aaron Kaufman, were invited to participate in a motorcycle build-off with long-established bike builders Orange County Choppers, Paul Jr. Designs, and Jesse James. Rawlings and Kaufman came in second to Paul Jr. with James coming in third.

Fast N' Loud is produced for Discovery by Pilgrim Studios, with Craig Piligian and Eddie Rohwedder serving as executive producers.

On June 19, 2019, the 15th season was announced to premiere on July 8, 2019. Season 16 was announced on March 2, 2020, and premiered on March 30.

On episode 1578 of The Joe Rogan Experience (aired on December 15, 2020), Rawlings confirmed that Fast N' Loud had ended.

Reception
In 2016, a survey of the 50 TV shows with the most Facebook likes by The New York Times found that Fast N Loud was "the show most favored by men on the list, by far — 83% of 'likes' came from men".

Episodes

References

External links
Gas Monkey Garage official site

Gas Monkey reddit

 

2010s American reality television series
2012 American television series debuts
2020 American television series endings
Automotive television series
Discovery Channel original programming